Stephanie St. James is an American-born actress, singer, mentor, and advocate for the disease endometriosis.

Life
Her mother, a Russian-born Jew, is the daughter of Holocaust survivors, her grandmother Sofia Katz being one of two Jewish survivors of the entire Jewish community in Budslav, Poland, and her grandfather David Kopelewicz a decorated partisan commander who saved the lives of hundreds of Jews during the Holocaust. Her father is of Guyanese descent and both met in Jerusalem, Israel.

Stephanie St. James grew up in the Northern California Bay Area, where she began her career in the theater at a very young age. She has been seen internationally in such productions as Oprah Winfrey presents "The Color Purple", for which she was nominated in 2008 for an NAACP Theater Award for Best Supporting Female - Equity for her role as "Squeak". Stephanie received the 2010 San Francisco Broadway World Fan Award for Best Leading Actress in a Musical Local, for her role as Mimi in Rent at 6th Street Playhouse in Northern California. Stephanie was also honored with the 2011 FREC Award by The Film Recording Entertainment Council in 2011 for Acting Coach of South Florida.

Stephanie St. James began her career after studying in New York City at the American Musical and Dramatic Academy, where she landed her first role in the European Tour of Fame the musical in her last semester of school. She later went on to originate the role of Rusty in the first national tour of Footloose the musical. She was seen by United States President Barack Obama at the Cadillac Palace Theater in her performance of The Color Purple in Chicago. Her theater resume includes such shows as Gary Marshall's Happy Days, Jesus Christ Superstar, Irish dance show Celtic Fusion, for which she recorded the soundtrack in Edinburgh, Scotland, Little Shop of Horrors, Grease, to name a few. Also as a recording artist her cover tune of ABBA's "Money, Money, Money" and John Denver's "Leaving on a Jet Plane" are popular singles worldwide from her debut independent releases The St. James Experience and What Did I Do? under the alias "St. James".

After suffering for over a decade with the painful symptoms of endometriosis, she was officially diagnosed with the disease in 2003. To date, it is noted that she has survived six major surgeries from the disease and she went public in 2007 to raise awareness. She is now an advocate for women suffering from endometriosis worldwide and is known as one of the first celebrity women suffering from the disease to go public.

St. James Acting Studio

Launched The St. James Acting Studio, which opened its doors in Miami, Florida, in the fall of 2010 and offers training in film, TV, commercials, musical theater, and voice-overs. Her students have been seen in such Broadway shows as Hamilton the Musical, films as Tom Cruise's Rock of Ages and the TV series Magic City, and Burn Notice.

References 
NAACP Theatre Award for Best Supporting Female - Equity.
NAACP Theatre Award for Best Supporting Female - Equity.
Entertainment Today Article.
Opray Winfrey. 
ABBA Money, Money, Money.

External links
Stephanie St. James Website
Internet Movie Database: Stephanie St. James

American stage actresses
American women singers
American people of Guyanese descent
American people of Russian-Jewish descent
Living people
Actresses from California
American people of Polish-Jewish descent
Year of birth missing (living people)
21st-century American women
People with Endometriosis